Leuconotis is a genus of plant in family Apocynaceae first described as a genus in 1823. It is native to  Southeast Asia (Thailand, Borneo, Malaysia, Sumatra).

Species
 Leuconotis anceps Jack - W Malaysia, Borneo, Sumatra
 Leuconotis bullata Leeuwenb. - Sabah
 Leuconotis eugeniifolia (Wall. ex G.Don) A.DC. - W Malaysia, Borneo, Sumatra
 Leuconotis griffithii Hook.f. - S Thailand, W Malaysia, Borneo, Sumatra

References

Apocynaceae genera
Rauvolfioideae